Kruglikovo is a village in the Bolotninsky District of Novosibirsk Oblast, Russia.

It has one school and one medical facility.

Geography and transportation
The village is located on the confluence of the Iksa and Ob rivers. It is connected by road to district administrative center, Bolotnoye, through the smaller village Nasonovo and the rural council seat of Karasyovo.

References

Rural localities in Novosibirsk Oblast